Desher Barta ( in English Country News) is a Bengali regional Television channel owned by Nearbymade International private limited. The Channel was launched in 2019 and broadcast from Raiganj, West Bengal. covering agriculture and rural development episodes and educational programs.

History 
In 2019 the channel started broadcasting through IPTV. In 2020 the channel fully digitalized and joined with a few TRAI-listed Multiple system operator for large-scale distribution.

Popular shows 
Matir Kotha ( Agriculture and Rural development related show).

Bigganer Duniya ( Science education related show).

Surer Aaksh ( Entertainment related show).

Sister concerns 

 Desher Barta Digital (Mobile app)

See also 

 List of Bengali-language television channels in India
 High News
 RCTV Sangbad
 Tribe TV

References

External links 

Bengali-language television channels in India
2019 establishments in West Bengal